Andrejević is a Serbian surname, derived from the name Andrej. It may refer to:

Aleksandar Andrejević, Serbian basketball player
Aleksandar Andrejević, Serbian football player
Đorđe Andrejević-Kun, Serbian painter
Jovan Andrejević-Joles,  first Serbian anatomist and one of the founding fathers of Serbian National Theatre
Milet Andrejevic, Yugoslav born American painter
Sima Andrejević, Serbian merchant
Stevan Andrejević-Palalija, Ottoman Serbian knez

See also
Andrejić
Andrijević
Andrić

Serbian surnames
Patronymic surnames
Surnames from given names